The sexual abuse scandal in the Catholic Archdiocese of Philadelphia, in Pennsylvania, U.S., is a significant episode in the series of Catholic sex abuse cases in the United States, Ireland and elsewhere. The Philadelphia abuses were substantially revealed through a grand jury investigation in 2005. In early 2011, a new grand jury reported extensive new charges of abusive priests active in the archdiocese. In 2012, a guilty plea by priest Edward Avery and the related trial and conviction of Monsignor William Lynn and mistrial on charges against Rev. James J. Brennan followed from the grand jury's investigations. In 2013, Rev. Charles Engelhardt and teacher Bernard Shero were tried, convicted and sentenced to prison. Lynn was the first official to be convicted in the United States of covering up abuses by other priests in his charge and other senior church officials have been extensively criticized for their management of the issue in the archdiocese.

Grand Jury in 2005 and aftermath

Cover-up by Cardinals Krol and Bevilacqua
On September 21, 2005, nearly 10 years after the death of Cardinal John Krol, a grand jury, impaneled by Philadelphia District Attorney Lynne Abraham, announced that Cardinal Krol was involved with the cover-up of a sex scandal against accused priests throughout the archdiocese, as was his successor 1988–2003, Cardinal Anthony Bevilacqua. Like the sex scandals in the Archdiocese of Boston, Krol and Bevilacqua transferred accused priests to other parishes throughout the archdiocese.

Using records subpoenaed from the archdiocese, the jury examined "secret archive" files for 169 priests and two deacons. To expose the extent of abuse and a "continuous, concerted campaign of cover-up", the jury documented 63 examples of abuse and where the abusers were assigned at the times of those attacks.  The grand jury also demonstrated that nobody could be prosecuted due to Pennsylvania's statute of limitations and other conditions that protect the archdiocese from being criminally accountable.

Three weeks into the 2012 Lynn trial, The Philadelphia Inquirer editorialized that "the clear outlines of an alleged cover-up ... as far up as" Bevilacqua had already emerged in the testimony. While the judge compelled the cardinal to testify in a closed hearing in November 2011, before the trial, neither the prosecution nor the defense used any of the testimony in the trial. The cardinal died in January 2012.

Role of Cardinal Rigali in 2005
Cardinal Justin Francis Rigali adopted the policy of laicizing those who were accused and confirmed by investigations. Cardinal Rigali, in cooperation with District Attorney Abraham and other district attorneys throughout the archdiocese, started the practice of both internal archdiocesan investigations, as well as external criminal investigations.

Cardinal Rigali staunchly defended the actions of his two predecessors, Krol and Bevilacqua, when they were named as sponsors of a cover-up by the September 2005, grand jury.

Actions of Bishop Cistone
According to the 2005 investigation, while serving as assistant vicar for administration in 1996, Joseph R. Cistone was involved with silencing a nun who tried to alert parishioners at St. Gabriel parish about abuse by a priest. According to the report, there were several other instances of priest sexual abuse which Cistone was complicit in covering up.  The report also indicated that Cistone was most concerned with the public relations ramifications of the sexual abuse. The report also showed that when a sex abuse victim demanded to meet with Cardinal Bevilacqua, Cistone refused the request, saying that allowing a sex abuse victim to meet with the Cardinal would "set a precedent. When these revelations became public, Cistone expressed sorrow for "any mistakes in judgment." However, Cistone refused to discuss the matter further, saying, "[I]t would not serve any purpose to revisit the grand jury report and endeavor to recall the rationale for past decisions made in specific cases."

Aftermath in Saginaw, Michigan
A week after being named to lead the Diocese of Saginaw, Cistone was asked by a mid-Michigan newspaper reporter about the grand jury investigation and his reported role in covering up instances of sexual abuse.  Cistone expressed unhappiness with how little opportunity he had been given to respond to the report, saying, "Unfortunately, the grand jury procedure, as followed in Philadelphia, did not allow for any opportunity to address such questions to offer explanation or clarification." Cistone also expressed surprise that he had not been questioned about the grand jury report during his introductory press conference and told the reporter, "Had it come up, I certainly would have addressed it."

On June 9, 2009, a group of survivors of clergy abuse protested Cistone's appointment outside the Saginaw Diocese office. Members of the Survivors Network of those Abused by Priests (SNAP) demanded that Cistone hold a public forum to explain his actions as described in the 2005 grand jury report.  SNAP President Barbara Blaine said the actions had to be taken because, "the innocence of children was shattered needlessly because of the action and inaction of this bishop." In response to the group's calls for transparency, Cistone said, "If someone wants to go back and rehash what the church may have done based on knowledge and experience or lack of experience the church had, well, that's OK, but that's not productive. What's productive is what we can do to move forward."

John McDevitt abuse scandal
A 2009 suit claims that Rev. John M. McDevitt, a religion teacher at Father Judge High School for Boys, abused Richard Green for six months in 1990 and 1991, according to a report by the New York Post. At the time, the victim's uncle, Cardinal John Joseph O'Connor, served as archbishop of New York.

According to abuse survivor accounts, McDevitt also molested children at Camp Brisson, a boys’ summer camp (located in Cecil County, Maryland) which was run by the Oblates of St Francis de Sales.

McDevitt's association with the Philadelphia Orphans’ Court, Summerdale Boys’ Club and all male Catholic high schools provided him access to minors. McDevitt used typical grooming techniques to build trust with his targets and victims. McDevitt attempted to create a closer connection with children by going by the moniker “Uncle Jack”.

In 2011, the Oblates of St Francis de Sales (the order or priests to which McDevitt belonged) admitted that McDevitt had sexually abused children, as part of a lawsuit settlement in the State of Delaware.

In 2018, the Pennsylvania grand jury report on sexual abuse of minors in the Catholic Church included the account of a male who stated that the adult McDevitt attempted to forcibly kiss him while in high school.

Use of the penile plethysmograph
During the abuse scandal, the reliability of the penile plethysmograph was questioned by some officials in the archdiocese of Philadelphia. Later, these officials chose to seek therapy at an institution where the plethysmograph was not used. This, even though the officials were made aware of the fact that the test was used by most experts and was believed to be of value in diagnosing sexual disorders. Later, a Grand Jury found that the Archdiocese of Philadelphia's decision to do so "had the effect of diminishing the validity of the evaluations and the likelihood that a priest would be diagnosed as a pedophile or ephebophile."

Mary Achilles
"In 2006, the Archdiocese hired Mary Achilles, the state's first victim advocate, to review its treatment of victims after a 2005 grand-jury report highlighted abuse by more than 50 priests over 50 years." Achilles, among other involvements in the field, has worked on the subject of restorative justice with Professor Howard Zehr of Eastern Mennonite University.

Monsignor accused and cleared
In 2011, an unidentified Monsignor was accused of sexual abuse from his time as vicar of Christ the King Parish in Northeast Philadelphia in the late 1960s, and again while principal of a school in Warminster, Pennsylvania.

He denied both allegations, and a church investigation determined that the charges were "unsubstantiated" and that he was "[s]uitable for ministry".

2011 grand jury
A second grand jury, in February 2011, accused the Philadelphia Archdiocese, still under Cardinal Rigali, of failing to stop the sexual abuse of children more than five years after the first grand jury report had documented abuse by more than fifty priests. The 2011 grand jury report said that as many as 37 priests were credibly accused of sexual abuse or inappropriate behavior toward minors. Rigali initially said in February "there were no active priests with substantiated allegations against them, but six days later, he placed three of the priests, whose activities had been described in detail by the grand jury, on administrative leave. He also hired an outside lawyer, Gina Maisto Smith, a former assistant district attorney who prosecuted child sexual assault cases for 15 years, to re-examine all cases involving priests in active ministry and review the procedures employed by the archdiocese." Three weeks later, most of those 37 priests remain active in the ministry. Terence McKiernan, the president of BishopAccountability.org, which archives documents from the abuse scandal in dioceses across the country, said "'[T]he headline is that in Philadelphia, the system is still broke.'" David J. O'Brien, who teaches Catholic history at the University of Dayton, stated, "The situation in Philadelphia is Boston reborn."

The appointment of Smith, the new outside lawyer for the archdiocese and a partner with the Ballard Spahr law firm, was criticized by SNAP's executive director, David Clohessy, who said "No lawyer or consultant is independent in any way, if they're picked and paid by Rigali. He can bring in a dozen more lawyers, but if he does what he did five years ago with the expert child-safety consultant and ignores every single recommendation, it's just going to be more empty promises and public relations." Clohessy was referring to the work of Mary Achilles. The 2011 grand jury found that "archdiocesan officials ignored all of Achilles' initial recommendations" ... Rigali hired Achilles again last week to perform the same service," according to one report. District Attorney R. Seth Williams said he respected Rigali's choice of Smith to lead the case review.

One commentator, Maureen Dowd in The New York Times, concluded, "Out of the church's many unpleasant confrontations with modernity, this is the starkest. It's tragically past time to send the message that priests can't do anything they want and hide their sins behind special privilege," and credited Philadelphia and District Attorney Williams with starting to send that message.

Legal proceedings

Monaco controversy

On December 3, 2020, William McCandless, a member of the Wilmington-based religious order Oblates de St. Francis De Sales who was formerly assigned to DeSales University in Lehigh County, was charged in Philadelphia for possession of child pornography. He also served as an adviser to Monaco’s royal family, Grace Kelly, the late mother of Monaco's leader Prince Albert, was also a native of Philadelphia. Much of McCandless' child pornography was imported from overseas as well. McCandless has been ordered to remain under house arrest until the outcome of his trial.

Edward Avery guilty plea and sentencing

In March 2012, "Edward Avery, 69, known for his moonlighting work as a disc jockey, pleaded guilty to involuntary deviate sexual intercourse and conspiracy to endanger the welfare of a child. He was immediately sentenced to 2½ to five years in prison. The charges stem from Avery's abuse of an altar boy at St. Jerome's Parish in Northeast Philadelphia in 1999, when Avery was 57 and the boy 10. ... Avery was at St. Jerome's despite a credible 1992 complaint that led him to undergo psychological testing at an archdiocesan-run psychiatric hospital, according to a 2005 grand jury report. He was pulled from his parish, put on a so-called "health leave" and then reassigned in 1993, the report said."

Two of Avery's victims testified to the Common Pleas Court jury in the William Lynn trial in April 2012. Lynn's alleged crime is not taking adequate action against Avery after having heard an accusation against Avery in 1992. Together the testimony of the two "represented a pillar of the landmark conspiracy and endangerment case prosecutors are trying to prove against" Lynn. Though he recanted his confession when called to testify against Monsignor William Lynn in January 2013, Avery was still serving his prison sentence by the time Lynn was released in January 2014.

William Lynn and James Brennan trial

Msgr. William Lynn, the pastor of St. Joseph Church in Downingtown, was arrested in February 2012, indicted in mid-March and, more than a week after the indictment, put on administrative leave by Archbishop Rigali. "According to a scathing grand jury report, Lynn, as secretary of clergy for the archdiocese, concealed the crimes of accused priests and put them in positions in which they could harm more children. Lynn is innocent and a victim of excessive zeal on the part of the District Attorney's Office, his lawyer, Jeff Lindy, said after his arrest." Lynn became the "most senior official of the Roman Catholic Church in the United States to be tried on charges relating to the child sexual abuse scandal" and "the first U.S. church official ever charged with endangering children for allegedly failing to oust accused predators from the priesthood or report them to police".

Lynn and Rev. James J. Brennan went on trial in late March 2012. Brennan is accused of the 1996 rape of a 14-year-old boy. The trial was to have included Edward Avery before Avery's guilty plea.

As the trial opened, Lynn and another of his attorneys, Thomas Bergstrom, were "insisting that [Lynn] tried to address the long-brewing sexual-abuse problem when he served as secretary for clergy from 1992 to 2004. [Deceased Cardinal] Bevilacqua and other superiors quashed his efforts .... The jury on Tuesday saw a 1994 list Lynn prepared that named 35 accused priests still on duty in the five-county archdiocese. Avery was on it [and a major subject on the opening day], and deemed 'guilty' of the abuse. The list also shows whether the archdiocese could still be sued over each allegation. Bevilacqua ordered that the list be shredded, although a copy survived".

The court heard Lynn testify on April 19, 2012, that the case of Rev. Stanley Gana "fell through the cracks" due to a job change. "A seminarian in 1992 told Lynn and Lynn's boss, the late Monsignor James Molloy, that he [the seminarian] had been raped throughout high school by ... Gana. The seminarian, who testified in person this week, gave Lynn and Molloy the names and parish of two other potential victims" but they made no contact with the victims. "Molloy told Gana to avoid contact with the seminarian because the allegations, if true, might be criminal. Lynn agreed with the assessment, according to his testimony. Asked why he didn't notify police, Lynn testified: 'Because we weren't required to.'" They did question Gana, who denied the charges. He remained as pastor at Our Mother of Sorrows in Bridgeport, Pennsylvania until 1995; moved to Florida and garnered further abuse inquiries back to Philadelphia from there; and "is 69 [but i]t's not clear where he's living", said the AP report, which also detailed the testimony on the extent and nature of the priest's, and his superiors', behaviors and actions.

On April 25, 2012, two of Avery's victims testified, "represent[ing] a pillar" of the case against Lynn. Avery had repeatedly denied guilt and passed polygraph tests. He accepted a guilty plea so that he would not die in prison.

In a subsequent trial, he surprised prosecutors by denying that he had molested boys. He said he took the plea to get a short sentence.

"[T]housands of confidential church records and years of abuse complaints against priests in the five-county archdiocese[, many of which] had been locked away for years in the so-called Secret Archives, church files that cataloged misconduct by priests", also came to light in the trial.

On June 22, 2012, Monsignor William Lynn was convicted of one of two child endangerment charges, and acquitted of a single count of conspiracy. Had he been convicted of all three charges, he would have faced 10 to 20 years in prison. Lynn was sentenced to three to six years in prison. This was the first time a Catholic church official serving in an administrative position in a diocese was convicted in the United States for covering up child sexual abuse by priests; efforts have been made to indict U.S. bishops as well, though prosecuting them would be more difficult, since they are viewed by the Vatican as being administrative extensions of it as well as overseers in their own right, despite being U.S. citizens. The jury deadlocked on attempted rape and endangerment charges against Brennan and Judge M. Teresa Sarmina declared a mistrial on those charges.

Prosecutors said in late June that they planned to retry Brennan. However, Brennan accepted a plea of no contest in October 2016 and instead got just two years probation.

Following arguments for lenient and stiff sentencing, Lynn was sentenced to three to six years in state prison. Judge Sarmina said he had "turned a blind eye while 'monsters in clerical garb' sexually abused children and devastated the church and community". The sentence was just short of the maximum and well above what the defense favored.

On December 22, 2015, the Pennsylvania Superior Court considered the remaining issues in Lynn's appeal and ordered a new trial for Lynn based on an evidentiary ruling at trial. The Commonwealth filed a motion for reargument which the Superior Court denied on February 10, 2016.

The Commonwealth appealed the Superior Court's ruling to the Pennsylvania Supreme Court on March 10, 2016, which the court denied in a per curiam order on July 26, 2016. The Philadelphia District Attorney's Office has since announced it will retry Lynn. Lynn was released in August 2016 after posting $250,000 in bail and had served 33 of his minimum 36-month sentence. However, he will remain on supervised parole until his retrial.

In 2019, it was reported that Lynn had been suspended from ministry following the 2011 grand jury investigation. On March 12, 2020, a new trial date was officially set for Lynn, with jury selection to start March 16, 2020. However, the COVID-19 pandemic forced Lynn's retrial to be delayed until January 2021.

Engelhardt and Shero trial
Rev. Charles Engelhardt and former parochial school teacher Bernard Shero were tried separately from William Lynn because they did not report to Lynn. They were both, with Avery, associated with St. Jerome's parish. The two were charged with rape, indecent sexual assault and other criminal charges in decade-plus-old assaults. Their primary accuser was called "Billy" in the 2011 grand jury report and was the key witness against the men. After delays, rescheduling and transfer to Judge Ellen Ceisler, the case was tried in January 2013 and both Engelhardt and Shero were convicted. In June 2013, Engelhardt was sentenced to six to 12 years in prison, and Shero was sentenced to eight to 16 years in prison. Both also must serve five years of probation after prison. With their families in court, both protested their innocence. "Engelhardt insisted he had no memory of meeting the former altar boy." He denied assaulting the boy and said after sentencing, "I have accepted this injustice [but] ... I believe it will be righted." Ceiler's sentences exceeded the mandatory minimums. '"The guidelines," she said, "shock my conscience and my sense of justice."'
 
Englehardt died in November 2014. He was handcuffed to a hospital bed, with two police officers standing guard. He was serving his sentence and was attempting to have his conviction overturned at the time of his death.

Armand Garcia
On March 5, 2019, Fr. Armand Garcia was arrested and charged with raping a female minor in 2014 while he was at the Immaculate Heart of Mary in Roxborough. At the time of his arrest, Garcia was the first priest whom Philadelphia authorities charged with sexual misconduct since the conclusion of a 2011 grand jury investigation that led to prosecutions of five area priests and the archdiocese's former secretary for clergy, Msgr. William J. Lynn.

Francis Trauger
On September 3, 2019, former Bucks County priest Francis Trauger was arrested and charged with sexually abusing two altar boys while serving at the  St. Michael the Archangel Church in Tullytown between the 1993 and 2003. Trauger, who was defrocked by the Vatican in 2003, will not be released until he can pay a $250,000 bail. On July 8, 2020, Trauger was sentenced to 18 to 36 months in prison, which he began serving a state prison and seven months probation after pleading guilty to two counts of indecent assault of a minor.

Robert L. Brennan
On September 5, 2019, accused former Philadelphia priest Robert Brennan was arrested at his home in Maryland after being indicted on four counts of lying to the FBI about molesting Sean McIlmail and faces federal charges. In 2013, his case produced the largest sex abuse settlement ever issued by the Archdiocese of Philadelphia, The same year, however, McIlmail committed suicide from a heroin overdose,  which prevented the case against Brennan from developing into a criminal trial. Brennan was defrocked by the Vatican in 2017.

Joseph L. Logrip
In December 2019, Archbishop Chaput accepted recommendations and found Monsignor Joseph L. Logrip "unsuitable for ministry." Longrip had been suspended from public ministry following allegations of sexually abusing a minor in the 1980s and an investigation soon followed. The results of the Archdiocesan Office of Investigation's investigation found that Longrip was "unsuitable for ministry." The results of the investigation were then forwarded to the Archdiocesan Professional Responsibilities Review Board, which also found Longrip "unsuitable for ministry." Chaput then accepted these recommendations and sent them to the Vatican's Congregation for the Doctrine of the Faith for further analysis. Longrip had previously been placed on administrative leave in 2011, but was allowed to return to public ministry despite being determined to be "unsuitable" by the Review Board in 2014 as well.

Civil cases
In September 2012, eight lawsuits brought by Andrew Druding and Michael W. McDonnell and seven other survivors joined eight other suits. Druding, 51, named the Rev. Francis S. Feret of St. Timothy parish in Mayfair in the early 1970s as his abuser, in a press conference the two held with attorneys. McDonnell said that in the late 1970s and early 1980s, he was abused by the Rev. John P. Schmeer and the now-laicized Francis X. Trauger of St. Titus parish and school near Norristown. The eight earlier-filed lawsuits involved different victims. Attorneys included Marci Hamilton, a legal advocate and expert on child sexual abuse; Malvern lawyer Daniel F. Monahan; and Jeffrey R. Anderson, a veteran litigator involving church sex-abuse cases, based in Saint Paul, Minnesota. Trauger was later arrested on September 3, 2019.

On October 7, 2015, a Pennsylvania state Superior Court ruled that two men who claim they were sexually abused by Catholic priests decades ago waited too long to sue the Archdiocese of Philadelphia over the alleged assaults. The Superior Court decision backs an earlier ruling by a Philadelphia judge who dismissed the lawsuits filed against the archdiocese by Francis Finnegan of Delaware County and Philip Gaughan of Delaware. Both men had filed their complaints independently in March 2011, and appealed the initial dismissals to the state court in 2014. Finnegan and Gaughan told the Associated Press in interviews soon after their suits were filed that they wanted to be named to encourage other victims to come forward. The Superior Court opinion, written by President Judge Susan Peikes Gantman, noted that Finnegan, now 54, claimed he was abused repeatedly from 1968 to 1970. Finnegan claimed in his suit that he suppressed the memories of the abuse until 2007. Those memories then came back to him "in waves," he claimed and he reported the abuse to the archdiocese's victim assistance program in 2008. Finnegan, who was diagnosed with post-traumatic stress disorder, refused the archdiocese's offers of medical and psychological assistance before filing his suit in Philadelphia County Court, Gantman noted. Gaughan, now 35, claimed he was molested from 1994 to 1997. He reported the abuse to the victim assistance program in 2010, and began counseling at the recommendation of program officials, court filings state. In his suit, Gaughan said he always remembered the abuse, but only recently linked it to his psychological problems, including PTSD. Philadelphia Judge Jacqueline F. Allen dismissed both lawsuits on statute of limitations grounds after the diocese filed motions for summary judgment. In agreeing with that decision, Gantman wrote that Pennsylvania law generally sets a two-year time limit filing lawsuits in childhood sexual abuse cases and does not waive that deadline even for cases involving repressed memories. So Finnegan's deadline to sue would have expired in 1972, Gantman found, while the cut-off for the filing of Gaughan's suit would have expired in 2000, two years after Gaughan turned 18. "The fact remains that they knew what was happening and who was doing it when the abuse occurred and should have instituted their (suits) within the prescribed statutes of limitations," the state judge wrote.
The Superior Court ruling could be appealed to the state Supreme Court. The priests Finnegan and Gaughan accuse of molesting them are now dead. Both filed their suits soon after a three priests and a high-ranking official of the archdiocese were charged by the Philadelphia District Attorney's Office with failing to protect children from priests who were pedophiles.

The defendants in the Finnegan and Gaughan suits included Monsignor William Lynn, who was the secretary for clergy for the archdiocese from 1992 to 2004 and was responsible for investigating reports of sex abuse by priests. Lynn was convicted of child endangerment during a trial in 2012 and was sentenced to 3 to 6 years in prison. He spent nearly 3 of his 3-6 year sentence behind bars before the Superior Court overturned his conviction in 2016. Lynn, now 64, served his sentence in the state prison at Waymart.  His retrial was ordered to begin in 2019, the year he is expected to retire from his duties as priest. It was later determined that his retrial would start in March 2020, but it was soon delayed due to the COVID-19 pandemic.

In 2013, a lawsuit was filed by the parents of Sean McIlmail, who had said that the now-defrocked priest, Robert L. Brennan, molested him between 1998 and 2001, starting when he was 11, while Brennan served at Resurrection of Our Lord parish. Criminal charges which were filed against Brennan prior to the lawsuit were dropped after McIlmail committed suicide in 2013 at the age of 26. On June 25, 2018, it was announced that the Philadelphia Archdiocese agreed to settle the lawsuit. The exact sum of the lawsuit's settlement remained undisclosed, but nevertheless was reported to be the largest sex abuse settlement in the history of the Archdiocese of Philadelphia. Brennan was later arrested in Maryland on September 5, 2019 on four counts of lying to the FBI about molesting McIlmail and was charged at the federal level.

Penitential service and other aftermath
In March 2011, Rigali invited Catholics to a special Stations of the Cross penitential service at the Philadelphia cathedral. The purpose of the service, he wrote in his Lenten letter, was 'the forgiveness of all sins and reconciliation with God and in the community.' SNAP, on the other hand, commented "that it took two harsh grand-jury reports and four indictments to get a 'prince of the church to finally temporarily take more predator priests away from kids.'"

Also in March 2011, reports emerged about an October 2003, form which had been apparently used by the archdiocese to prevent archdiocesan officials from reporting some information about alleged sex abuse by clergy to civil authorities. Any individual reporting alleged abuse by Church personnel was required to sign the form.

In commentary in the National Catholic Reporter Michael Sean Winters reported he had heard only fifty people showed up at the penitential service.

Another commentator for NCR, Richard McBrien, a personal acquaintance with Rigali's, drew attention to the failure of Rigali to live up to the 2002 Charter for the Protection of Children and Young People. McBrien went on to note that in his opinion, relative to the second grand jury report, Rigali had "made an unfortunate mistake in fundamental logic by making a universal negative assertion that could be rebutted by even a single case to the contrary ... [by] denying the allegation that there were other abusive priests still at work in the Archdiocese ... [when] [s]oon thereafter he removed twenty-one priests." He also noted the parallels with Cardinal Bernard Law's stance and actions in Boston in 2002.

Resignation of Rigali and appointment of Chaput
In July 2011, the Holy See accepted Rigali's resignation, which he had tendered in 2010 when he reached age 75, in accordance with the 1983 Code of Canon Law. He "offered an apology 'if I have offended' and 'for any weaknesses on my part,' but said he saw no particular connection between the timing of the Vatican accepting his resignation and turbulence" over the February grand jury report. Denver Archbishop Charles J. Chaput, OFM Cap, was named to succeed Rigali. The embattled Cardinal Rigali retired to the Diocese of Knoxville in East Tennessee where he resides with Bishop Richard Stika.

More reaction
 
In late July 2011, Robert Huber at Philadelphia magazine published a 7,630-word article which opened with Rigali's question "Is it true?" about the 2011 grand jury report. It moved on to ask "Will the Catholic Church as we know it survive in Philadelphia?" as he began to tell the story of Joe, a 59-year-old  who spoke of his abuse at the hands of Father Schmeer when in the ninth grade at Roman Catholic High School. Joe spoke this summer to "fellow parishioners at his church—St. Mary of the Assumption Parish in Manayunk. The leader of Joe's men's group and a victims advocate for the archdiocese set up the meeting. Perhaps 30 people came. Joe discovered something, after he spoke, that shocked him. It was that other people saw him as a hero." The piece concluded with a critique from Donna Farrell, writing on behalf of the Archdiocese of Philadelphia, which began: "Unfortunately for Philadelphia magazine readers looking for honest, in-depth reporting, this piece is an agenda-driven travesty of salacious innuendo masquerading as journalism." Farrell said Huber had been given access to Achilles and Smith but "chose to omit these perspectives from his piece" and hence missed the "significant steps" the archdiocese had taken to rectify the situation. This left the piece "sensational, wildly unfair, and incomplete." Farrell is the director of communications for the archdiocese.

As the William Lynn trial proceeded in mid-April 2012, The Philadelphia Inquirer led an editorial: "Three weeks into a likely months-long landmark clergy sex-abuse trial, a Philadelphia jury already has seen the clear outlines of an alleged cover-up by Archdiocese of Philadelphia officials as far up as Cardinal Anthony J. Bevilacqua." After detailing numerous testimonies of abuse, the editorial continued: "Both Lynn and [James] Brennan deny the allegations. Whatever the eventual verdicts, testimony likely will have removed all reasonable doubt as to the cover-up's existence, and the need for reform." Specifically, the paper went on to say: "Harrisburg lawmakers need to act on proposals still being fought by the state's Catholic bishops — most vocally by Philadelphia Archbishop Charles J. Chaput — that would waive civil statutes for a brief period to allow those victims to seek justice. As done in Delaware and California, a so-called "civil window" would further expose the abusers' dirty secrets and help lead to healing in the church, and beyond. State legislators need not await a jury verdict to do the right thing by abuse victims."

Lynn punishment and Chaput actions

In July 2012 when Archbishop Chaput's investigation cleared one accused priest, SNAP reacted with sharp criticism of Chaput's procedure, saying decisions were "held in secrecy for months or weeks until the archbishop and his public relations staffers deem it's most advantageous to disclose them. Chaput continues to act recklessly and selfishly ... with little or no regard for children's safety." At the same time, SNAP also called "again" on Archbishop Chaput to proceed to laicize Lynn after his conviction; and for "eliminating Pennsylvania's archaic, arbitrary, predator-friendly statutes of limitations".

In January 2014, the archdiocese, prominently defended by Chaput, posted bail for Lynn. In April 2015 the state supreme court upheld the initial conviction and revoked Lynn's bail. He was returned to serve the balance of his 3-to-6 year term.

Events Since April 2014

In July 2014,  the cases took another odd turn. The attorneys for Englehardt and Shero filed motions for new trials based on  claims of prosecutorial misconduct. They were able to establish that the prosecution attorneys had interviewed Ms.. Judy Cruz-Ransom, a social worker who had interviewed Danny "Doe," in the presence of her lawyers. The prosecution did not tell the defense about the interview or about what she said. The defense lawyers said this was a Brady violation because prosecution is required to reveal all exculpatory evidence before trial begins.  This denied the defense of an opportunity to support the testimony given by Hagner, the other social worker who had interviewed Danny Doe.. The judge promptly sealed the cases, giving no explanation for why this action was taken. The prosecutors refuse to answer questions about the matter. However, neither the Philadelphia Inquirer not the local media has covered this strange turn of event.

In December 2015, the Superior Court set aside Lynn's conviction and ordered a new trial because the trial judge spent so much time hearing  about other victims going back to 1948- testify about matters that largely did not involve Lynn. The appeals court ruled that, in admitting the 21 extraneous cases, she had willingly admitted "prejudicial evidence."   A three member appeals court panel shelved the conviction, and in February, 2016, the full court backed the decision of the panel. The Philadelphia County prosecutors appealed that decision to the State Supreme Court.  Judge Theresa Sarmina, still the presiding judge of record, ruled that Lynn was a flight risk and must remain in Graterford prison until the State Supreme Court renders a decision. On July 26, 2016,  the Pennsylvania Supreme Court rejected the appeal of District Attorney Williams. The court ruled that Lynn must be retried.

In August 2017, the district attorney announced that he would retry Lynn in 2017. Though Lynn, then stood un-convicted, it was first proposed that he remain in prison until early October, when a parole board had earlier ruled he could be released. In the end, however, the court decided to release him on August 4 under $250, 000 bond. He had served 33 months in prison and 18 months of house arrest. The latter did not count toward time-served.

In late March 2017 Judge Gwendolyn N. Bright struck down Lynn's  claims that prosecutorial misconduct should be grounds to prevent a new trial. The defense had earlier shown that the prosecution did not inform it of a witness who had exculpatory evidence. It was believed that this new case involved a social worker, but it turned out to be a retired police detective, Joseph Walsh, who had been brought back to  question the main witness, "Danny Doe" or "Danny Gallagher," a twenty-three-year-old man. . Walsh picked apart the claims of Gallagher and was told by an angry  prosecutor was told he was destroying the prosecution case. Bright ruled that concealing the Walsh evidence was not "intentional" prosecutorial misconduct. She gave the defense 30 days to file an  appeal.  Msgr. Lynn's attorneys said there would be an appeal, and it will probably delay his retrial.

In 2016, Newsweek obtained a psychiatric report on Danny Gallagher, the alleged victim,  that he admitted not giving his medical personnel accurate information about his medical and personal history. He also admitted that he had provided others with unreliable information regarding claims of sexual abuse. Though his story repeatedly changed, and he eventually disavowed most of the most lurid claims, the Archdiocese of Philadelphia eventually decided to end his case against it by paying Danny Gallaher something in the neighborhood of $5 million. The Philadelphia Inquirer, which played a large role in supporting the prosecution, opted not to comment on the Newsweek revelations.  By then much of the Grand  Jury material had become public, as well as police and medical reports on the main witness. Eventually it even came out that Danny Doe told dramatically conflicting stories, and the more dramatic and fantastic of them became public.

In August 2017  parochial school teacher Bernard Shero's conviction was overturned in a Post-Conviction Relief Act case because Judge Ellen Ceisler found prosecutorial misconduct in that the prosecutors did not tell the defense attorneys that Detective  Joe Walsh had grave questions about Danny Gallagher's truthfulness.  Shero had served four and a half years of a sixteen-year sentence. Shero had to assent to a lesser plea to justify time served and avoid a new trial. He also had to agree that Walsh not be called to the stand. However, Walsh had provided a 12-page affidavit with the Philadelphia County Court of Common Pleas.

Walsh was called out of retirement to work on the case, but what he was expected to do was hotly contested. The prosecutors said Walsh was only to coach Danny Gallagher so he could testify effectively. Walsh said he was expected to investigate, and he  conducted 35 to 40 interviews and found nine factual discrepancies. Twenty one of the interviews were conducted at St. Jerome parish and school. Walsh concluded that Danny was lying. For example, Danny said Father Avery first contacted him when he was working on the fifth grade bell team. Fifth grade boys did not have that duty as they were not strong enough for that duty. That was the work of eighth grade boys. Danny said Avery molested him after Avery presided at a July 1999 funeral.  Avery had no funeral at that time. Danny offered dramatically different stories about how the two priests abused him. Then he said he made up the first stories and offered tales that were not so fantastic. The prosecutors never revealed that Gallagher offered different stories. Walsh obtained evidence from Danny's older brother that destroyed his claims against Fr. Engelhardt. Walsh repeatedly informed ADA Maruana Sorensen of his findings. She repeatedly said she believed everything Gallagher said.

On March 12, 2020, jury selection in Lynn's retrial was ordered to start on March 16, 2020. However, the COVID-19 pandemic forced his retrial to be delayed until January 2021.

Investigations in other Pennsylvania dioceses

There have been a number of investigations of abuse in the seven other dioceses in Pennsylvania.  Although these diocese are suffragan dioceses of the Archdiocese of Philadelphia, their governance and oversight is separate.  For details on these investigations, see Grand jury investigation of Catholic Church sexual abuse in Pennsylvania.

Pennsylvania state government enacts new legislations

On November 26, 2019,  Pennsylvania Tom Wolf signed into law legislation which significantly reformed the state's child sex abuse statue. The new law: abolishes Pennsylvania's criminal statute of limitations on childhood sexual abuse and extends the timeline victims have to file civil action against their abusers; clarifies penalties for failure to report child abuse;
makes conversations with law enforcement agents exempt from non-disclosure agreements; and
creates a fund for victims of sexual abuse to pay for abuse-related therapy. The provisions in the new legislation were also recommended by the 2018 grand jury report.

Reparations
On May 5, 2020, the Archdiocese of Philadelphia announced that it now expected to pay $126 million in reparations. The archdiocese also said its Independent Reconciliation and Reparations Program, which was established in 2018, has received a total of 615 claims, and had settled 208 of them for $43.8 million as of April 22, 2020. That averages out to about $211,000 per claim, which is in line with what other dioceses have been paying under similar programs.  The same day, however, the total number of money which the Archdiocese of Philadelphia expects to pay in its sex abuse settlements was soon revised to $130 million by Archbishop of Philadelphia Nelson J. Perez.

Extent of lawsuits
On August 14, 2020, it was revealed that the Archdiocese of Philadelphia and its suffragan dioceses of Pittsburgh, Allentown and Scranton were enduring the bulk of 150 new lawsuits filed against all eight Pennsylvania Catholic dioceses.

References

External links
 Grand Jury Report on the Sexual Abuse of Minors by Clergy, by Gwendolyn N. Bright, Supervising Judge re: Misc. No. 03-00-239, Court of Common Pleas, First Judicial District of Pennsylvania, Criminal Trial Division; Office of the District Attorney of the City of Philadelphia, 2011 — PDF version via A.W. Richard Sipe, 2013.

Sexual abuse
Catholic Church sexual abuse scandals in the United States
Incidents of violence against boys
Incidents of violence against girls